Marc'Andria Maurizzi (born 16 May 2007) is a French chess grandmaster.

Chess career
Maurizzi earned his Grandmaster title in 2021, a few days after turning fourteen, becoming the youngest French player to achieve the title.

References

External links

2007 births
Living people
Chess grandmasters
French chess players